Mount Roots is a mainly snow-covered mountain on South Georgia, standing near the head of Nordenskjold Glacier,  ESE of Mount Paget. The mountain, fifth-highest on the island, is a prominent feature and presumably was known to whalers and sealers in South Georgia at an early date.

It was roughly surveyed in the period 1925–30 by DI personnel, and resurveyed by the SGS, 1951–52. Named by the UK-APC for James W. Roots, a member of the SGS, 1951–52.

The first ascent was made by British climbers Will Manners and Stuart Macdonald on the north buttress in January 2001.

Roots, Mount